Meadowhall is an indoor shopping centre in Sheffield, South Yorkshire, England. It is the largest shopping centre in Yorkshire, and currently the eleventh-largest in the United Kingdom. As of 2021, plans for an extension are currently under consideration, for completion in the 2020s, which would make Meadowhall the fourth-largest shopping centre in the United Kingdom.

Architecturally, the original construction of Meadowhall in the early 1990s was inspired by the Place d'Orléans shopping centre in Ottawa, Canada. The Meadowhall Retail Park is a separate development, owned by British Land, lying almost  to the south of Meadowhall shopping centre in the Carbrook area of the city.

History

The shopping centre was built by Bovis on the site previously occupied by Hadfields' East Hecla steelworks.

The centre was opened on 4 September 1990. It is similar in concept to the Merry Hill Shopping Centre at Brierley Hill in the West Midlands, which was completed just before Meadowhall.

With over 280 stores, Meadowhall has been widely blamed for the closure of shops in both Sheffield City Centre, and Rotherham town centre. Meadowhall is owned by British Land, a property developer. The centre attracted 19.8 million visitors in its first year of opening, and now attracts about 30 million visitors a year.

One of Meadowhall's largest stores of the past, Sainsbury's on Market Street (originally branded SavaCentre in the 1990s) closed in July 2005 and was replaced by new Next and Primark stores in the summer of 2007. Sainsbury's store relocated to Crystal Peaks. There was a Namco Station arcade in The Oasis food court which closed in September 2007 after more than 15 years at the shopping centre. December 2005 saw Meadowhall become home to the fifth Apple Store in the UK, and in late 2007 it gained the third Puma Store in the UK, after London and Glasgow. The centre was also home to the only McCafé in Yorkshire, which has been replaced with a franchise called ‘Love Koffee’. The centre's Burger King which was located on Market Street got replaced by a small franchise called ‘Burger Knight’ in October 2007 when it reopened after the 2007 floods. The small franchise, along with Greggs, Massarella's Coffee, Crawshaws Butchers and Pollard's Tea and Coffee were forcibly shut in May 2008, only had just recently spent thousands of pounds on refurbishment after the 2007 floods - these stores were closed down so Meadowhall could create larger stores which are now occupied by Love Aroma, Game, Garage Shoes, Quiz and Yours Clothing.

In October 2012, Norges Bank Investment Management (NBIM) announced that the Norwegian Government Pension Fund Global had bought 50 percent of the UK shopping centre Meadowhall for £348 million, or approximately 3.2 billion Norwegian kroner.

In 2014, the mall ‘Park Lane’ was refurbished in the style of a "boutique arcade". In 2017, Park Lane was modernised during the 2015-2017 £60 million refurbishment, and is now seen as the most upmarket area of Meadowhall, with stores such as Pretty Green, Flannels, Hugo Boss, White Stuff and Yo! Sushi.

2015–2017 refurbishment

Meadowhall celebrated its 25th anniversary in 2015, and announced in the same year a £60 million interior refurbishment to make it fit with newer centres opened since 1990. The refurbishment allowed some retailers to install double-height shop fronts. The first phase was completed in April 2017 and the second phase was completed in November 2017 with most of the work being done when after hours so as not to disrupt shopping, each area of Meadowhall has been themed to fit a certain style. After the  closure of the BHS branch in August 2016, it was announced that Primark would be expanding its store into half of the vacant store, with Sports Direct taking up the other half, and that Wilko would be moving into the store already taken up by Sports Direct; this was completed in March 2018. The House of Fraser store has also been refurbished along with the centre, as well as Apple, AllSaints, Yo! Sushi, Hollister, Schuh, JD Sports and the opening of new stores such as Tag Heuer, Flannels, Joe Browns, Skinny Dip and River Island Children making the centre being perceived as more "upmarket". Restaurants such as Handmade Burger Co and Pizza Express in the Oasis Dining quarter have also been refurbished with a new Gourmet Burger Kitchen, however this has since closed.

Scenes from the music video of the Sheffield-based duo Moloko's first single "Fun For Me" were shot in the Oasis area of the shopping centre.

Extension
In May 2012, British Land announced that planning permission had been sought to provide a  retail extension to Meadowhall on adjacent land, the plans however were not approved. In December 2014, a new Next home store and a Costa Coffee drive-thru was opened on the land next to Meadowhall where the extension was to be built. The Next home store came after IKEA had originally had plans to build a store close to Meadowhall however Next won the bid to build on the land instead. A new IKEA store however began being built on land next to Meadowhall retail park in August 2016. The store opened on 28 September 2017.

In October 2016, it was announced plans had been put forward for a £300 million leisure extension to be built with a new cinema to replace the Vue in the Oasis, a bowling arcade, trampoline park, new restaurants, shops and a garden terrace along with a new multi-storey car park to replace the old one the extension would be built upon. In June 2017, the plan was scaled down by reducing the size of the new cinema and removing a food store. Sheffield city council gave planning permission to the development in September 2017. The extension was scheduled to be completed by 2021–2022, however in November 2018 construction had not yet began and it was announced that the plans for the extension were to be revised with a new plan hoped to be drawn up in the second quarter of 2019. In May 2020, British Land said the extension was unlikely to go ahead due to the uncertain times caused by the COVID-19 pandemic. New plans for the extension were unveiled in July of the same year and include a temporary leisure park on the site of the M1 distribution centre; the new cinema was also taken out of the new plans however the current Vue cinema would be refurbished.

Flooding incidents 
The worst affected areas were between Market Street and The Arcade. Meadowhall reopened six days after a big cleanup operation and trading recommenced on the upper level. The majority of shops on the ground floor were boarded up for weeks on end (some for up to two months) so the interiors could be refitted - the centre fully relaunched in late September 2007. Meadowhall has since installed flood gates, to prevent this from happening in the future.

Meadowhall was also affected by the November 2019 floods on Thursday 7 November, the same night as the annual Christmas Light Switch-on. Although the event was cancelled, many people had already begun to travel for the performances. Once people had arrived public transport was already cancelled, affecting people all over South Yorkshire. With conditions growing worse across the area, many shops and businesses began to close, with a number of people being left stranded in the Meadowhall premises until the following morning. The shopping centre itself was not flooded internally during the November 2019 floods, as improved flood defences and barriers had been installed since the previous events of 2007.

Sections
The main Meadowhall structure is divided into multiple sections, each with a distinct identity.

High Street
The High Street section is occupied by lower-cost shops and essentials services, such as banks and bureau de change.

The Arcade
The Arcade is the central section, containing more upmarket shops.

Park Lane
Modelled as a boutique shopping space, Park Lane is home to more expensive shops and services.

The Gallery
The Gallery is home to many lower-cost high street shops. It contains 5 of the centres 9 anchor tenants including the high-street fashion chains Next, Primark, New Look and H&M as well as the sports retailers Sports Direct and USC.

The Oasis
The dedicated food court and leisure space. The downstairs area consists of mainly takeout restaurants, while the upstairs area consists of sit-down restaurants.

The Lanes
Adjacent to the Oasis, the Lanes is a small shopping section home to 20 small, independent and specialty shops.

Oasis Dining Quarter and cinema

The Oasis Dining Quarter is Meadowhall's food court which has food outlets and seating on both floors. The ground floor contains mostly fast food outlets including McDonald's, KFC, Subway, Pizza Hut, Five Guys and Barburrito but includes restaurants Nando's, Harvester and a Wetherspoons. The upper floor consists mostly of restaurants including Tapas Revolution, Frankie & Benny's, Coal Grill And Bar, PizzaExpress, Wagamama, Handmade Burger Co, Zizzi and T.G.I. Fridays. In July 2011 following the opening of T.G.I. Fridays, the food court underwent a £7 million redevelopment which saw it re-branded from 'Oasis Food Court', to 'Oasis Dining Quarter'. Restaurants such as Las Iguanas, CiaoBaby and Giraffe were added as part of the redevelopment.

Vue cinema
The dining quarter includes an eleven screen Vue multiplex cinema. It opened as a Warner Bros Theatre in 1993, before becoming a Warner Village Cinema and was rebranded Vue as part of their takeover of the chain in 2004. The cinema was refurbished after the 2007 flooding.

Transport connections
Meadowhall has a public transport interchange, Meadowhall Interchange, making it the only shopping centre in the UK that combines a bus, rail and tram interchange as well as making the centre accessible to both the local region and the rest of the country.

Motorway
The centre is located at junction 34 of the M1 motorway.

Sheffield Supertram
Meadowhall is served by two stops on the Sheffield Supertram network; the Yellow Line terminus at Meadowhall Interchange is located to the north of the shopping centre, while Tinsley / Meadowhall South tram stop is located to the south of the shopping centre and is served by the Yellow Line and tram-train services to Rotherham Parkgate.

Meadowhall Interchange tram stop is located 15 minutes from the city centre and Meadowhall is used as a park and ride. The Yellow Line from Meadowhall passes the Sheffield Arena, Ice Sheffield, the Institute Of Sport and the Valley Centertainment entertainment complex.

Bus
The interchange has a large bus station with routes covering most of South Yorkshire, but especially the local Sheffield and Rotherham area.

Train

Awards 
The centre has won awards, including two awards for innovative events at the ICSC maxi awards 2006, held in Chicago and two awards for its Retail Bonding Programme (in best Retail Partnership category) and also for its commercialisation, (adding value to the customer shopping experience) at the BCSC Purple Apple Awards in London.

Environmental policy 

The centre recycles 97% of waste from retailers and customers, with the remaining three percent going to incineration with energy recovery; no waste goes to landfill.

Meadowhall was the first UK shopping centre to develop an on-site recycling facility.  The Resource Recovery Centre, which opened in 2006, operates a conveyor belt system to separate out types of waste, from paper to plastic, cardboard to cans.

Meadowhall began to harvest rainwater in 2006. Four water storage tanks collect rainwater and condensation from air conditioning. This is then used throughout the Shopping Centre for cleaning, flushing toilets and watering the external landscaped areas.  The tanks are nearly 7 metres high and can hold  of water each.

In 2008, Meadowhall installed a bore hole. This is a narrow shaft drilled into the ground that collects water from beneath the earth.  Water from the bore hole is collected into a master tank. The storage tanks are connected onto a "network", which will ensure 90-95% of all water used by customers and retailers for flushing toilets is derived from rainwater harvesting or bore hole water.

Facial recognition trial 
In 2018, Meadowhall was the site of a month-long police trial of facial recognition software by South Yorkshire Police, without the public's knowledge. In August 2019, a spokeswoman for British Land, Meadowhall's owner, said, "Over a year ago we conducted a short trial at Meadowhall, in conjunction with the police, and all data was deleted immediately after the trial". Big Brother Watch's chief executive Silkie Carlo was reported by the BBC as saying, "There is an epidemic of facial recognition in the UK. The collusion between police and private companies in building these surveillance nets around popular spaces is deeply disturbing".

References

External links
Meadowhall website
Meadowhall Radio
Meadowhall retail database

Shopping centres in South Yorkshire
Buildings and structures in Sheffield
Shopping malls established in 1990
British Land